Louise Gade (born 15 June 1972, in Thyborøn) is a Danish cand.jur., president of Aarhus VIA University College and former mayor of Aarhus, Denmark.

Louise Gade is the daughter of Harry Gade and Anna-Marie Gade. She was a student of Struer Gymnasium (Struer Highschool) in 1991, after which she moved to Aarhus to study law. During her studies she became a member of the national board of Danmarks Liberale Studerende. In I 1997/1998 she obtained a degree as cand.jur. from Aarhus Universitet. From July 1997 to January 2002 she worked as a lawyer at the law firm Lokdam, Kjellund & Partnere in Århus. In 2001 she married Ulrik G. Westring.

Louise Gade was a member of Aarhus City Council from 1994 and in 1995–1998 she was the president of the city council group of Venstre. From 1998 she was a member of Økonomiudvalget (Board of Economy). Her political career culminated in 2002 when she became the first female and non-social democratic mayor of Aarhus. In 2005 Venstre lost the election and Louise Gade stopped as mayor although she received a record 42.697 personal votes. In 2006 she became a member of the Magistrate department for Children and Youth.

In 2008 Gade announced she would not run for another term. In 2009 Gade left Aarhus city council and became vice-president for human resources at Aarhus University and in 2015 she became president of VIA University College.

See also 
 List of mayors of Aarhus

References

Aarhus University alumni
Venstre (Denmark) politicians
1972 births
Women mayors of places in Denmark
Living people
People from Lemvig Municipality